Badevaripalem is a village in Voletivaripalem mandal, located in the Sri Potti Sriramulu Nellore district of Indian state of Andhra Pradesh.

It is located 12KM from Mandal Headquarters Voletivaripalem and 8KM from nearest Town Kandukur. Badevaripalem Village is a Panchayat and is a part of Nekunampuram@Pokur Revenue Village.

{
  "type": "FeatureCollection",
  "features": [
    {
      "type": "Feature",
      "properties": {},
      "geometry": {
        "type": "Point",
        "coordinates": [
          79.83198165893555,
          15.188203935569526
        ]
      }
    }
  ]
}

References

Villages in Prakasam district